Roger Christopher Willis (born 17 June 1967) is an English former professional footballer who played as a midfielder or forward. He made more than 300 appearances in the Football League between 1989 and 2002 playing for seven different clubs.

Career
Willis, a native of Sheffield generally known by his nickname of Harry, played for Nottingham-based non-league club Dunkirk before joining Grimsby Town in 1989. He made ten first-team appearances for the Mariners in all competitions, and spent time on loan to Boston United in the Conference, before being sold to Barnet for £10,000 at the end of the 1989–90 season.

In his first season with Barnet, Willis helped them win the Conference title and consequent promotion to the Football League. A flourishing second season, in which he was one of the key players as Barnet reached the playoff semifinal, earned him a move to First Division (second-tier) club Watford in October 1992 for a fee of £175,000. After a relatively unsuccessful year with the Hornets, he rejoined former Barnet manager Barry Fry, now at fellow First Division club Birmingham City, for a fee of £150,000. Willis left for Southend United after ten months, and went on to feature for Peterborough United before settling down for a five-year spell with Third Division (fourth-tier) Chesterfield, whom he helped gain promotion in the 2000–01 season.

Released by Chesterfield in 2002, he made a brief return to Peterborough, followed by occasional appearances for non-league clubs Kettering Town, Stevenage Borough, Cambridge City and Hucknall Town, before retiring from the game in February 2003. He came out of retirement to play for St Albans City in 2004.

References
Infobox statistics
 Football League clubs: 
 Boston United: 
 Barnet (Conference): 
 Kettering Town: 
 Stevenage Borough: 
 Cambridge City: 
 Hucknall Town: 
 St Albans City: 

General

1967 births
Living people
Footballers from Sheffield
English footballers
Association football midfielders
Association football forwards
Dunkirk F.C. players
Grimsby Town F.C. players
Boston United F.C. players
Barnet F.C. players
Watford F.C. players
Birmingham City F.C. players
Southend United F.C. players
Peterborough United F.C. players
Chesterfield F.C. players
Kettering Town F.C. players
Stevenage F.C. players
Cambridge City F.C. players
Hucknall Town F.C. players
St Albans City F.C. players
English Football League players
National League (English football) players
Southern Football League players
Northern Premier League players
Isthmian League players